Rafaela Amado Gomes de Azevedo (born 21 January 2002) is a Portuguese swimmer. She competed in the women's 50 metre backstroke event at the 2020 European Aquatics Championships, in Budapest, Hungary.

References

External links
 

2002 births
Living people
Portuguese female swimmers
Portuguese female backstroke swimmers
Place of birth missing (living people)
Swimmers at the 2022 Mediterranean Games
Mediterranean Games medalists in swimming
Mediterranean Games bronze medalists for Portugal
21st-century Portuguese women